Reis is a 2017 Turkish biographical film about Recep Tayyip Erdoğan, the incumbent President of Turkey. It was released shortly before the constitutional referendum which aimed for a transition to an executive presidency.

Synopsis 
Reis describes Recep Tayyip Erdoğan's childhood and his mayoral tenure. The movie ends when he entered prison as a consequence of reading a religiously intolerant poem in Siirt ("minarets are bayonets, domes are helmets, mosques are our barracks, believers are soldiers").

Cast
 Reha Beyoğlu as President Recep Tayyip Erdoğan
 Özlem Balcı as Emine Erdoğan
 Orhan Aydin as Komiser Serhat
 Ayhan Eroğlu as Hasan Yesildag
 Abidin Yerebakan as Mustafa
 İsmail Hakkı Ürün as Ismail
 Volkan Basaran as Sultan Baskan

Controversy and reception
Hüdaverdi Yavuz, the director of the movie, refused to attend the movie's premiere, citing various troubles during the shooting, unpaid staff, and his forcefully reduced involvement in the post-production process as reasons. IMDb attributed the film a rating of 1.8 based on over 71,000 ratings. Reis attracted shy of 67,580 viewers in the first three days (March 3-5). Despite the low rating, Reis managed to eclipse Kod Adı: K.O.Z.'s reception.

See also 
 Kod Adı: K.O.Z.
 Turkish constitutional referendum, 2017

References

External links
 
 

2017 films
2017 in Turkish politics
Biographical films about politicians
Films set in Turkey
2010s Turkish-language films
Turkish political films
Turkish drama films
Turkish propaganda films
Films set in Istanbul